Yosotarashi-hime no Mikoto, also known as Yosotarashi Hime or Onakatumi no Hime, is a figure in Japanese mythology who appears in the Kojiki, an ancient chronicle of Japan. She is said to have been the empress of Emperor Kōshō, the fifth emperor of Japan, and the sister of Okitsu Yoso, an ancestor of the Owari clan.

History

According to the Kojiki, Yosotarashi-hime no Mikoto was the sister of Okitsu Yoso, an ancestor of the Owari clan. However, alternate versions of her origins are found in the Nihon Shoki, another ancient chronicle of Japan. In these versions, she is said to be the daughter of either Isonokami no Agatanesihae or Toyoaki Sadahime, both of whom are said to be ancestors of the Yamato clan.

Yosotarashi-hime no Mikoto had several children, including Amoeshi Tarashi Hiko no Mikoto, who is said to be the ancestor of several noble families such as the Kasuga no Omi, Ohoya no Omi, Ahata no Omi, Onono Omi, Kakimoto no Omi, Ichihi no Omi, Ohosaka no Omi, Anano Omi, Taki no Omi, Haguri no Omi, Chita no Omi, Muza no Omi, Tunoyama no Omi, Ise no Ihitaka no Kimi, Ichishi no Kimi and Chikatsuafumi no Kuni no Miyatsuko.

References

Japanese imperial history
Japanese empresses